Alfred Harrison Weatherford, Jr. (October 10, 1853 – October 16, 1913) was an American politician in the state of Washington. He served in the Washington House of Representatives from 1889 to 1891.

References

1853 births
1913 deaths
People from Unionville, Missouri
Democratic Party members of the Washington House of Representatives
19th-century American politicians
People from Dayton, Washington